The 1930–31 season was the thirty-sixth season in which Dundee competed at a Scottish national level, playing in Division One, where they would finish in 8th place. Dundee would also compete in the Scottish Cup, where they would make it to the 3rd round before being knocked out by Aberdeen in a replay.

Scottish Division One 

Statistics provided by Dee Archive.

League table

Scottish Cup 

Statistics provided by Dee Archive.

Player Statistics 
Statistics provided by Dee Archive

|}

See also 

 List of Dundee F.C. seasons

References

External links 

 1930-31 Dundee season on Fitbastats

Dundee F.C. seasons
Dundee